The Diocese of Aberdeen is one of the thirteen (after 1633 fourteen) historical dioceses of the Scottish church.

Diocese of Aberdeen may also refer to:
 Roman Catholic Diocese of Aberdeen, modern Roman Catholic diocese resurrected in the late 19th century upon the model of the old diocese, and is based at Aberdeen
 Diocese of Aberdeen and Orkney, Scottish episcopal created in the 18th century on the model of two earlier dioceses combined, and based at Aberdeen